Schistocerca damnifica, known generally as the mischievous bird grasshopper or Carolina locust, is a species of bird grasshopper in the family Acrididae. It is found in North America.

References

Further reading

External links

 

Acrididae
Articles created by Qbugbot
Insects described in 1861